Anthony Gerard Bosco (August 1, 1927 – July 2, 2013) was an American prelate of the Catholic Church who served as the third bishop of the Diocese of Greensburg in Pennsylvania from 1987 to 2004.  He previously served as an auxiliary bishop of the Diocese of Pittsburgh in Pennsylvania from 1970 to 1987.

Biography

Early life 
Anthony Bosco was born in Pittsburgh, Pennsylvania, on August 1, 1927.  Raised on Pittsburgh's North Side, Bosco graduated from North Catholic High School in Pittsburgh.  He then attended St. Fidelis Seminary in Butler Count, Pennsylvania, and St. Vincent Seminary in Latrobe, Pennsylvania. 

Bosco was ordained a priest for the Diocese of Pittsburgh by Bishop John Francis Dearden on June 7, 1952.Bosco held a variety of positions in the Pittsburgh chancery and was named a monsignor in 1968. During part of that time, he was a chaplain and instructor at Mercy Hospital School of Nursing in Pittsburgh.

Auxiliary Bishop of Pittsburgh 
Pope Paul VI appointed Bosco as an auxiliary bishop of the Diocese of Pittsburgh and titular bishop of Labicum on May 4, 1970 by Pope Paul VI.  He was consecrated by Cardinal John Joseph Wright on June 30, 1970,

Bishop of Greensburg 
Bosco was appointed bishop of the Diocese of Greensburg on April 2, 1987, after Bishop Connare retired. Bosco was installed on June 30, 1987.

Bosco’s dogs Joshua and Joshua II were local celebrities within the Catholic community of Greensburg.  Pope John Paul II accepted Bosco's retirement as bishop of Greensburg on January 2 , 2004. Anthony Bosco died on July 2, 2013, at his residence in Greensburg.

References

1927 births
2013 deaths
People from New Castle, Pennsylvania
Religious leaders from Pittsburgh
20th-century Roman Catholic bishops in the United States
21st-century Roman Catholic bishops in the United States
Roman Catholic bishops of Greensburg
Saint Vincent College alumni
Catholics from Pennsylvania